St Helens R.F.C. is an English professional rugby league club based in St Helens, Merseyside. Formed in 1873, the club has competed in the sport since the foundation of the Northern Rugby Football Union in 1895. This list details the club's achievements in all major competitions

Seasons

Super League era

Notes

References
 
 

St Helens R.F.C. seasons
St Helens
British rugby league lists